Alexander Albert Manzano (born 1987), better known as his stage name Alexander Spit, is an American rapper and record producer from Los Angeles, California. He released his commercial debut full-length on January 29, 2013 on Decon Records.

Biography 

Spit grew up in the Bay Area to a Filipino mother and San Francisco-raised father. Spit's first foray into rap music was with a group called The Instant Messengers. At 21, Spit went solo and released his first album Open 24 Hours when he turned 23. The album, as well as his subsequent project Until Next Summer (2010), were released through local streetwear company The Hundreds.  After the success of his instrumental tape, Mansions, which landed on Complex Magazine's "50 Best Albums of 2012 (So Far)", Spit began work on his commercial debut. The album was called A Breathtaking Trip To That Otherside and was inspired by his move to Los Angeles and hallucinogenic drugs. It was released on Decon Records in January 2013 and featured E-40, The Alchemist and Action Bronson.

Discography

Studio albums

Mixtapes

Singles

Production discography

2015 

 Pell - Limbo
 10. "Sandlot"

2017 

 Homeboy Sandman - Veins
 09. "Lemon Ginger Tea"

 Linkin Park - One More Light
 08. "Halfway Right" 

 Jay IDK - IWasVeryBad
 12. "Baby Scale" (featuring Yung Gleesh)

2018 

 Duckwrth -
 "Michuul"

 Mac Miller - Swimming
 06. "Wings"

2019 

 Duckwrth - I'm Uugly
 10. "Ruun"

2020 

 lojii - lo&behold
 09. "Each Day (I Pray For)"
 13. "Longwayhome"

 Mac Miller - Circles
 14. "Floating" 

 Sideshow - Farley
 05. "Vrrydrrty_2" (featuring Zelooperz and MIKE)

 Medhane - Cold Water
 08. "Na Fr" 

 All City Jimmy - DRFTR
 02. "DRFTR"

 Caleb Giles - Meditations
 additional producer

 Mia Carucci -
 "La Loba" 

 Navy Blue - Song of Sage: Post Panic!
 05. "Certainty" (featuring Maxo)
 17. "Enough" (featuring Zeroh)

2021 

 Sideshow - Wicked Man's Reprise
 04. "Soul on ICE"
 05. "Brother Below"
 06. "Calls From Kemet"
 10. "Forward Only"
 12. "Bobby da Physical Body"

 Medhane - Amethyst of Morning
 07. "Who Made the Rain?"

 Mia Carucci - As Above So Below
 01. "Trial of Tears"
 03. "Primal Deep"

2022 

 Earl Sweatshirt - Sick!
 08. "God Laughs"

References

Rappers from Los Angeles
Rappers from the San Francisco Bay Area
Living people
1987 births
21st-century American rappers